The Jay Dee is a Chesapeake Bay log canoe, built in 1931, by John B. Harrison in Tilghman, Maryland, She is  long with a beam of , and built of five logs. She is one of the last 22 surviving traditional Chesapeake Bay racing log canoes that carry on a tradition of racing on the Eastern Shore of Maryland which has existed since the 1840s. She is located at St. Michaels, Talbot County, Maryland.

She was listed on the National Register of Historic Places in 1985.

References

External links
, including photo in 1984, at Maryland Historical Trust

Ships in Talbot County, Maryland
Ships on the National Register of Historic Places in Maryland
National Register of Historic Places in Talbot County, Maryland